Cologania is a genus of flowering plants in the legume family, Fabaceae. It belongs to the subfamily Faboideae.

Species
The following species are recognised in the genus Cologania:
 Cologania angustifolia Kunth
 Cologania biloba (Lindl.) G.Nicholson
 Cologania broussonetii (Balb.) DC.
 Cologania capitata Rose
 Cologania cordata Fearing ex McVaugh
 Cologania grandiflora Rose
 Cologania hintoniorum B.L.Turner
 Cologania hirta (M.Martens & Galeotti) N.E.Rose
 Cologania obovata Schltdl.
 Cologania pallida Rose
 Cologania parviflora V.M.Badillo
 Cologania procumbens Kunth
 Cologania racemosa (B.L.Rob.) Rose

References

External links 

Phaseoleae
Fabaceae genera